Hazeltine Lake is a lake  in Chaska, along the fairways of Hazeltine National Golf Club, in Carver County, Minnesota, in the United States.

Hazeltine Lake is named for the Hazeltine family of early settlers; Lake Susan is named for Susan Hazeltine.

The golf club, adjacent to the lake, settled on the name “Hazeltine" when it opened in 1962.

See also
List of lakes in Minnesota

References

Lakes of Minnesota
Lakes of Carver County, Minnesota